Saulius is a Lithuanian masculine given name.

People named Saulius include:

Saulius Ambrulevičius (born 1992), Lithuanian figure skater
Saulius Atmanavičius (born 1970), Lithuanian footballer
Saulius Binevičius (born 1979), Lithuanian freestyle swimmer
Saulius Brusokas (born 1968), Lithuanian weightlifter and strongman competitor
Saulius Kleiza (born 1964), Lithuanian track and field athlete 
Saulius Klevinskas (born 1984), Lithuanian footballer
Saulius Kulvietis (born 1991), Lithuanian basketball player
Saulius Kuzminskas (born 1982), Lithuanian basketball player
Saulius Mikalajūnas (born 1972), Lithuanian international football midfielder
Saulius Mikoliūnas (born 1984), Lithuanian professional footballer
Saulius Mykolaitis (1966–2006), Lithuanian director, singer-songwriter, bard, and actor
Saulius Pakalniškis (1958–2006), Lithuanian zoologist, entomologist, and dipterologist
Saulius Pečeliūnas (born 1961), Lithuanian politician
Saulius Ritter (born 1988), Lithuanian rower
Saulius Ruškys (born 1974), Lithuanian cyclist
Saulius Šaltenis (born 1945), Lithuanian writer, newspaper editor, and politician
Saulius Šarkauskas (born 1970), Lithuanian former cyclist
Saulius Širmelis (born 1956), Lithuanian football coach and former player
Saulius Skvernelis (born 1970), Lithuanian politician, former Prime Minister of Lithuania 
Saulius Sondeckis (1928–2016), Lithuanian violinist, conductor, orchestra leader, and professor 
Saulius Štombergas (born 1973), Lithuanian basketball player

Masculine given names
Lithuanian masculine given names